The 1988 LSU Tigers football team represented Louisiana State University during the 1988 NCAA Division I-A football season. The LSU offense scored 249 points while the defense allowed 204 points.

Season
In the Tiger Bowl, LSU beat Auburn in what would be known as the Earthquake Game.

Schedule

Roster

Team players drafted into the NFL

References

LSU
LSU Tigers football seasons
Southeastern Conference football champion seasons
LSU Tigers football